Clear Lake is a village in Sangamon County, Illinois, United States. The population was 267 at the 2000 census. It is part of the Springfield, Illinois Metropolitan Statistical Area.

Geography
Clear Lake is located at  (39.814177, -89.566965).

Clear Lake is located northeast of Springfield and southwest of Riverton

The Sangamon River runs along the east side of the village.

History
Camp Butler National Cemetery is located just to the north of Clear Lake. There is also a body of water located in the village called Clear Lake. Civil War-era Camp Butler’s training and mustering grounds were on the banks of and close to Clear Lake. As an isolated, sand-bottom lake, it provided relatively clean water for the troops and horses. After the Civil War this was a popular recreation area for many in the Springfield area. Clear Lake declined in importance after the larger Lake Springfield was built in the 1930's. Clear Lake was bought by the City of Springfield in the 2000's as a backup water source. George Donner, of the infamous Donner Party, lived in the Clear Lake area with his family and is buried at Oak Hill cemetery in the village.

The village is sometimes referred to as one with Clear Lake Township, although they are technically separate entities.

Education 
Residents of Clear Lake are in the Riverton School District.

Transportation 
The town is located just to the northeast of the Interstate 55/Interstate 72 interchange near Springfield.  Old US Route 36 runs directly through the village. Illinois Route 54 is located a few miles north of the village.

Notable Places 
The Oaks Golf Course (formerly Oak Crest Country Club)

Gravel Pits (backup water supply for Springfield)

Devil's hole fishing area

Old Sangamon River Bridge

Roselawn and Oak Hill Cemetery

Sugar Creek

Sangamon River

Clear Lake

Demographics

As of the census of 2000, there were 267 people, 104 households, and 79 families residing in the village. The racial makeup of the village was 96.25% White, 1.12% African American, 1.12% Asian, 0.75% from other races, and 0.75% from two or more races. Hispanic or Latino of any race were 1.87% of the population.

There were 104 households, out of which 35.6% had children under the age of 18 living with them, 53.8% were married couples living together, 13.5% had a female householder with no husband present, and 23.1% were non-families. 22.1% of all households were made up of individuals, and 9.6% had someone living alone who was 65 years of age or older. The average household size was 2.57 and the average family size was 2.90.

In the village, the population was spread out, with 27.0% under the age of 18, 4.5% from 18 to 24, 32.2% from 25 to 44, 25.1% from 45 to 64, and 11.2% who were 65 years of age or older. The median age was 39 years. For every 100 females, there were 89.4 males. For every 100 females age 18 and over, there were 89.3 males.

The median income for a household in the village was $37,708, and the median income for a family was $40,536. Males had a median income of $35,625 versus $30,278 for females. The per capita income for the village was $15,284. About 18.4% of families and 14.1% of the population were below the poverty line, including 24.6% of those under the age of eighteen and 22.9% of those 65 or over.

References

Villages in Sangamon County, Illinois
Villages in Illinois
Springfield metropolitan area, Illinois
Lakes of Illinois
Bodies of water of Sangamon County, Illinois